The Ottawa Giants were a professional minor-league baseball team based in Ottawa, Ontario, Canada that operated in 1951 after the relocation of an existing Triple-A team, the Jersey City Giants. It played at Lansdowne Park in Ottawa and finished with a 62–88 record, in seventh place in the eight-team International League and 31 games in arrears of the regular season and playoff champion Montreal Royals.  The Ottawa Giants drew 117,411 fans through the Lansdowne Park turnstiles, also seventh in the league.

History
As radio and television broadcasts of New York City area baseball teams increased, Jersey City's attendance plunged from 337,000 in 1947 to 63,000 in 1950. Ottawa had most recently hosted the Nationals and the Senators of the Class C Border League from 1947–50, leading that league in attendance for three of its four seasons and making the playoffs each year.

The Jersey City team was owned by the New York Giants. Tommy Gorman, who held the exclusive rights to baseball at Lansdowne Park, engineered a deal to have the New Yorkers move their Jersey City team to Ottawa for the 1951 season. The Ottawa Giants and the Minneapolis Millers of the American Association were the two Triple-A farm clubs of the New York Giants in 1951. However, the parent club decided to scale back and only operate one Triple-A club in 1952. After one season, the Ottawa team was sold to the Philadelphia Athletics, who operated the team as the Ottawa Athletics from 1952 to 1954.

Roster
Source: 

P George Bamberger
OF Johnny Barrett
P Charlie Bishop
1B Marv Blaylock
P Roger Bowman
P Pete Burnside
1B Lorenzo Cabrera
P Al Corwin
P Walter Cox
1B/2B/OF Piper Davis
P Chuck Eisenmann
P Jerry Fahr
P Frank Fanovich
3B Billy Gardner
OF Harvey Gentry
1B/OF Fred Gerken
P Red Hardy
P George Heller
2B Bobby Hofman
SS Ziggy Jasinski
OF Milt Joffe
OF Stan Jok
OF Pete Karpuk
P Alex Konikowski
P Dick Libby
P Raúl López (Cuban)
OF Paul Mauldin
OF Dutch Mele
OF John Metkovich
2B William Metzig
P Harry Nicholas
C Edward Sokol
P Andy Tomasic
C Pat Tomkinson
2B/SS Mylon Vukemire
C Neal Watlington
IF Artie Wilson
P Ed Wright

References

External links
1951 Ottawa Giants page at Baseball Reference

Baseball teams established in 1951
Sports clubs disestablished in 1951
Defunct International League teams
Gia
New York Giants minor league affiliates
Defunct baseball teams in Canada
1951 establishments in Ontario
1951 disestablishments in Ontario
Baseball teams disestablished in 1951